Tanks of the Second World War

Tankettes
A tankette is a type of lightly armed and lightly armoured tracked combat vehicle resembling a small tank roughly the size of a car, mainly intended for light infantry support or reconnaissance. Colloquially it may also simply mean a "small tank".
Carden-Loyd tankette

Medium tanks
These inter-war tanks were built to supply the British Army after the First World War. Heavier than most light tanks, they proved to be under-gunned and under-armoured. Some did see action in France and the Low Countries in 1940. They were armed with either the QF 3 pdr or the Vickers machine gun. All were withdrawn from service by 1941.
Vickers Medium Mark I 
Vickers Medium Mark II

Light tanks
These were a series of similar small tanks produced by Britain in the years between the First and Second World Wars mainly for use in Imperial duties. They saw use in training, and in limited engagements with British Imperial units in colonial policing actions before the war. All were about 5 tonnes, the earlier models had a crew of two and were armed with a 0.303 Vickers machine gun. The later had a crew of three and a heavy machine gun (the 0.50 inch version of the Vickers machine gun or 15mm Besa machine gun) as well as 0.303 or 7.92mm Besa machine gun. 
Although some were used in France and North Africa at the start of the war, they were removed as not fit for service in armoured divisions. 

Light Tank Mk I 
Light Tank Mk II 
Light Tank Mk III 
Light Tank Mk IV 
Light Tank Mk V 
Light Tank Mk VI

The last of the light tanks were produced during the Second World War. Not considered suitable for use in armoured divisions, they were trialled in airborne operations. All were armed with the QF 2 pdr anti-tank gun.
Light Tank Mk VIII
Light Tank Mk VII Tetrarch I

Cruiser tanks
These medium-sized cruiser tanks were the mainstay of British armoured units during the war. Weighing 10-35 tonnes, they were fast and mobile, and were designed to operate independently of the slow-moving infantry and their more heavily armoured infantry tank support. They were built specifically to fight a mobile war against other tanks. They were armed with anti-tank guns, from the QF 2 pdr to the QF 17 pdr or the general purpose 75 mm. 
Mk I (A9) 
Mk II (A10) 
Mk III (A13)
Mk IV (A13 Mk II) 
Mk V, Covenanter (A13 Mk III) 
Mk VI Crusader (A15) 
Mk VII Cavalier (A24)
Mk VIII, Cromwell (A27M) 
Challenger (A30) 
Comet (A34)

Infantry tanks
The infantry tank was a concept developed by Britain in the years leading up to the war. They generally carried more armour than the cruiser tanks, as they did not need such a high top speed. They were designed to work as close support for the infantry. They were armed with either the QF 2 pdr, QF 6 pdr, or the QF 75 mm.
Mk I, Matilda I (A11) 
Mk II, Matilda II (A12) 
Mk III, Valentine
Mk IV, Churchill (A22)

Self-propelled artillery
Self-propelled artillery vehicles were a way of enabling the Royal Artillery to function with the same degree of battlefield mobility as conventional tank formations. They were self-propelled guns, usually based on a tank chassis, which were normally used for long-range indirect bombardment support on the battlefield. In contrast to American doctrine, mobile anti-tank weapons were also considered self-propelled guns and were similarly operated by the Royal Artillery. 
Bishop - 25 pdr gun-howitzer on Valentine tank chassis 
Deacon - 6 pdr anti-tank gun on armoured truck chassis
Archer - a self-propelled anti-tank gun

Armoured personnel carriers
Armoured personnel carriers were armoured fighting vehicles developed to transport infantry
 Universal Carrier

Armoured cars
Light and medium scout and reconnaissance vehicles were used by most British Army units, especially battalions of the Reconnaissance Corps and cavalry units. These fast wheeled vehicles usually weighed from 3 to 10 tonnes. Armament ranged from Bren light machine guns (or Boys anti-tank rifle), Besa machine guns, up to QF 2 pdr and 6-pdr guns.
AEC Armoured Car 
Coventry Armoured Car 
Daimler Armoured Car 
Guy Armoured Car 
Humber Armoured Car 
Lanchester Armoured Car
Morris CS9 
Rolls-Royce Armoured Car 
Standard Beaverette
Humber Light Reconnaissance Car 
Morris Light Reconnaissance Car 
Otter Light Reconnaissance Car
Dingo Scout Car 
Humber Scout Car

Other vehicles
Armoured Trucks
Armadillo - Home Guard use only
Bedford OXA - armoured car for home defence, Home Guard use only
Armoured Command Vehicles
AEC Armoured Command Vehicle
Guy Lizard

Commonwealth-produced armoured vehicles
Armoured vehicles built outside Britain for Commonwealth forces.
Tanks
Ram tank (Canada)
Sentinel tank (Australia) - never reached service
Bob Semple tank (New Zealand) - never reached service
Self-propelled artillery
Sexton (Canada) - 25 pdr on Ram tank chassis
Armoured personnel carrier
Kangaroo (Canada) - conversions of armoured vehicles
Armoured cars and scout cars
Dingo Scout Car (Australia) 
Lynx Scout Car (Canada) - adaptation of Daimler Dingo using local chassis and engine
S1 Scout Car (Australian) 
Fox Armoured Car (Canada) - adaptation of Humber armoured car produced using local chassis
Marmon-Herrington Armoured Car (South Africa) 
Rhino Heavy Armoured Car (Australia) 
Rover Light Armoured Car (Australia) 
Armoured Carrier Wheeled Indian Pattern (India)
Trucks
C15TA Armoured Truck (Canada)

Lend-Lease Armoured vehicles
American armoured vehicles were purchased and sometimes re-fitted with British guns, and were used by British and British-supplied Allied forces throughout the war.
Sherman IC and VC - Sherman I and Sherman V medium tank chassis adapted by the British with a redesigned turret to mount a British 17-pounder gun. The 17-pounder could knock out any German tank. Often referred to by the post-war nickname "Firefly", but during WWII this nickname was also used for the 17pdr M10.
Lee and Grant - M3 Lee medium tank
3in SP M10 - M10 tank destroyer
17pdr SP M10 - M10 tank destroyer equipped with a British 17-pounder gun
Stuart tank (nicknamed "Honey") - M3 Stuart light tank
Locust - M22 airborne light tank
Chaffee - M24 light tank
Priest - M7 self-propelled artillery

Prototypes
These vehicles were never put into production.
Black Prince - Churchill development to carry 17-pounder
Excelsior - heavily armoured assault tank
Tortoise heavy assault tank - a very heavy armoured tank for use in breaching fixed defences in Europe
Valiant - a heavily armoured but small assault tank intended for use in the war in the Far East. 
Alecto - a self-propelled gun on a light tank chassis
TOG1 - tank design suitable for crossing shelled areas and trenches
TOG2

See also
British armoured fighting vehicle production during World War II
British military vehicle markings of World War II

References

External links

British Tanks
WW2:A British Focus - Armoured

Production during World War II, British, armored fighting vehicle
World War II tanks of the United Kingdom